"Oops!" is a song by South Korean boy band Super Junior featuring their labelmate girl group f(x). The track is released as part of Super Junior's repackaged version of their fifth studio album, Mr. Simple (as "A-Cha") on September 19, 2011.

Background
The lyrics of the song are written by Misfit and Super Junior members Eunhyuk, Donghae, Shindong, Leeteuk and Heechul, which are also the ones who wrote the rap verses. SM describes the song as "a unique rap song which shows Super Junior’s own distinctive charms and the featured artist f(x)’s refreshing voice and sound effects double the fun of the song." 
The song also features the use of guitar and an acid-sounding synthesizer background performed by Hitchhiker, the producer and director of the song.

Performances 
The song was first performed in the KBS music program Yoo Hee-yeol's Sketchbook on September 30, 2011 together with Girls' Generation member Tiffany. The song was also performed during the Super Show 4 Tour on November 19 and 20 with f(x) members Amber, Victoria and Sulli.

Charts

References

External links
 Super Junior's Official Site

2011 songs
Super Junior songs
F(x) (group) songs
Korean-language songs
Songs written by Kalle Engström